Christian Lunet de La Malène (5 December 1920 in Nîmes – 26 September 2007), was a French and European politician. He was a member of the UDR party.

He served as the French Minister of Scientific Research and Atomic and Space Questions from 1968. Prior to that he served as a Member of the European Parliament, including acting as the head of the Progressive Democrats group.

Honors
 Chevalier de la Légion d'honneur
 Croix de guerre 1939-1945

Bibliography 
 Une espérance inassouvie : 30 ans d'Europe, Christian de La Malène, 1989

References
Christian de La Malène - Obituary

1920 births
2007 deaths
Debout la France politicians
21st-century French politicians
MEPs for France 1979–1984
MEPs for France 1984–1989
MEPs for France 1989–1994
Union of Democrats for the Republic politicians
Senators of Paris